Cosford Reynold Woods (October 15, 1899 – February 28, 1992) was a Canadian ice hockey goaltender.

Woods was a member of the Saskatoon Quakers who represented Canada at the 1934 World Ice Hockey Championships held in Milan, Italy where they won Gold.

See also
List of Canadian national ice hockey team rosters

References

Canadian ice hockey goaltenders
Saskatoon Quakers players
1899 births
1992 deaths